South Hiendley is a village and civil parish in the City of Wakefield in West Yorkshire, England.  It has a population of 1,667, increasing to 1,817 at the 2011 Census.  Until 1974 it was part of Hemsworth Rural District.

The village is on the edge of the county of West Yorkshire in the Wakefield area 8 miles (14 km) from the city centre. However it is marginally closer to the town of Barnsley 7 miles (12 km) just across the border in South Yorkshire. It has a Barnsley postcode (S72) and telephone code (01226).

The village has one public house, The Sun Inn, (the Fox Inn was demolished in 2013), a primary school (South Hiendley Junior Infant and Early Years School) and a Doctor's surgery.

See also
Listed buildings in South Hiendley

References

External links

Villages in West Yorkshire
Civil parishes in West Yorkshire
Geography of the City of Wakefield